is a Japanese rock band founded in July 2006 by Hiroto Kōmoto (vocals) and Masatoshi Mashima (guitar), both previously of The Blue Hearts and The High-Lows, with Masaru Kobayashi (bass) and Katsuji Kirita (drums).

History 
After The High-Lows ceased activity in November 2005, Mashima proposed forming a new band with Kōmoto. Due to an introduction from a recording engineer named Satoshi Kawaguchi, known from the time of The Blue Hearts, Kobayashi and Kirita joined the formation of The Cro-Magnons. The name of the band came after Mashima and Komoto saw The Rolling Stones perform live at the Nagoya Dome. Their first album had already been recorded and the band was tentatively named "Kuromaniyonzu".

With their album due to be finished in the winter of 2006, they appeared all over the country in summer music events without announcement and without a name. On the net, people blinked and wondered "Is this Hiroto and Mashi's new band?" Before their live performance on Osaka's "Meet The World Beat 2006," news of their appearance was leaked and some of the crowd called out "Hiroto!", "Mashi!". With a bitter smile, the band members said "It wasn't a secret at all." At 1:41pm on July 23, The Cro-Magnons made their first official appearance as a band. Two months later, on September 20, the band began their first nationwide tour, "The Cro-Magnons Shutsugen Tour!!" (ザ・クロマニヨンズ出現ツアー!! The Cro-Magnons Appear Tour!!).

The band had a second tour in early 2007, entitled "Haru no Uraura Matsuri" (春のウラウラ祭り Spring Gently Shining Festival), with 16 performances nationwide.

The Cro-Magnons continue to be prolific in their songwriting and touring. Recent tours have included the tour for the Rainbow Thunder album which began November 7, 2018 going until April 20, 2019 and also the tour for the Punch Album which ended early in March 2020 due to safety concerns about the Coronavirus.

Band members 
Founders, Hiroto Kōmoto and Masatoshi Mashima, worked together in two previous bands—The Blue Hearts and The High-Lows. Bassist Masaru Kobayashi previously performed with Sads and Soy Sauce Sonix. He is currently involved in nil. Drummer Katsuji Kirita also performs with Gargoyle.

Discography

Albums

Singles

References

External links 
 Official website

Japanese rock music groups
Musical groups established in 2006
Musical quartets
Musical groups from Tokyo
2006 establishments in Japan